Kamalapati Palace is located on the bridge, between the larger and the smaller lake of Bhopal. Built in 1722, it is named after Rani Kamlapati the widow Gond ruler of Nizam Shah, Chief of Ginnorgarh. The palace has been designated as a Monument of National Importance by the Archaeological Survey of India (ASI).

Location
Kamalpati Palace is located inside Kamla Park and it is in Bhopal.

History 
Kamalapati Palace lies on the eastern side of the ancient embankment known as Bhojpal, built by the Parmara Rajput King Bhoj (AD 1010–1055) from which the present name Bhopal is derived. The existing structure is a part of the palace which was constructed by Rani Kamlapati, in AD 1722. On the Western side of this palace are the remains of Fatehgarh Fort on the hill which was built by Sardar Dost Mohammad of Bhopal (AD 1708–1726) who laid the foundation of modern Bhopal. This monument was declared protected by the Government of India in 1989 and since then Archaeological Survey of India remains the custodian.

Architecture 
Kamlapati palace is an example of contemporary secular architecture of the early eighteenth century and the earliest extant example in the Bhopal Town. This double storied building is constructed of lakhauri bricks having a facade with cusped arches supported on the fluted pillars, merlons having the shape of lotus petals and brackets supporting the Chhajjas.

Gallery

References 
 https://www.ixigo.com/rani-kamlapati-palace-bhopal-india-ne-1360361
 http://www.asibhopal.nic.in/monument/bhopal_bhopal_kamlapatimahal.html
 https://web.archive.org/web/20161102195954/http://asi.nic.in/asi_monu_alphalist_mp.asp
 http://asibhopal.nic.in/staff_listofincharge.html
 http://www.asibhopal.nic.in/monument/pdf/distt.bhopal/bhopal/kamlapati_mahal_and_adjoining/ONLY%20PRE.pdf

Palaces in Madhya Pradesh
Royal residences in India
Tourist attractions in Bhopal
Buildings and structures in Bhopal